An interpreter is someone who performs interpretation, not just translation, of speech or sign from a language into another.  This may be done orally, or via other methodology.  It may be simultaneous, but need not be.

Interpreter may also refer to:

Math and computing
 Interpreter (computing), a computer program that directly executes a programming or scripting language
 Interpreter pattern, a software engineering design pattern which embeds an interpreter inside a system
 Punched card interpreter, a machine that interprets the holes in a punched card

Media

Film
 The Interpreter, a 2005 film
 The Interpreter (2018 film), a 2018 Slovak film
 The Interpreter, a film starring Jake Gyllenhaal due to start shooting in 2022.

Literary
 The Comics Interpreter, a magazine of comics criticism
 The Interpreter or Interpreter Magazine, a web publication by the Institute of Modern Russia
 The Interpreter (Kim novel), a 2003 novel by Suki Kim
 The Interpreter: A Story of Two Worlds New York, a 2012 book by Robert Moss
 The Interpreters (novel), is a 1965 novel by Wole Soyinka
 Interpreter (journal)

Music
 The Interpreters, a Philadelphia band
 Interpreter (album), a 1996 album by Julian Cope
 The Interpreter (album), a 2011 live album by Rhett Miller of Old 97

Other
 Left-brain interpreter, the post-hoc construction of explanations by the brain's left hemisphere

See also
 Interpretation (disambiguation)
 Interpreted language, in computing